Gong est Mort, Vive Gong (translated as "Gong Is Dead, Long Live Gong") is a double live album by the progressive rock group Gong, recorded on 28 May 1977 at the Hippodrome, Paris, France, and originally released in 1977 as a double LP by Tapioca Records, France.

Overview
Gong appeared as the headlining act in a 24-hour marathon festival which also included sets by Tim Blake, Lady June, Strontium 90, Steve Hillage, "Shamal Gong", "Gong-Expresso" and Daevid Allen & Euterpe. The poster advertising the event can be seen in the photo collage included in the album Gong Live Etc, also released in 1977.

The Gong lineup was a reunion of the Angel's Egg/You-era band, featuring the return of Daevid Allen, Gilli Smyth, Steve Hillage and Miquette Giraudy, who had left in 1975 and so were not part of the then-current Gong-Expresso (which would eventually change its name to Pierre Moerlen's Gong).

Their set included most of the music from four albums - Camembert Electrique and the three albums of the Radio Gnome Invisible trilogy - therefore this album documents less than half of the performance and some songs are absent or incomplete. Many are slightly renamed from their original titles.

Track listing

Side one
"Can't Kill Me" (Daevid Allen) – 7:53
"I've Been Stoned Before" (Allen) / "Mister Long Shanks" (Allen) / "O Mother" (Allen) – 6:39
"Radio Gnome Invisible" (Allen) – 2:39

Side two
"Zero the Hero and the Witch's Spell" (Allen, Christian Tritsch) – 10:04
"Flute Salade" (Didier Malherbe) / "Oily Way" (Allen, Malherbe) / "Outer Temple" (Blake, Hillage) – 10:09

Side three
"Inner Temple (Zero Meets The Octave Doctor)" (Allen, Malherbe) – 6:01
"IAO Chant and Master Builder"  (C.O.I.T.) – 7:05
"Sprinkling of Clouds" (C.O.I.T.) – 4:50

Side four
"From the Isle Of Every Where to the End of the Story of Zero the Hero" (C.O.I.T.) – 12:14
"You Never Blow Your Trip For Ever" (C.O.I.T.) – 8:26

Personnel
Bert Camembert (Daevid Allen) – vocals, guitar
Shakti Yoni (Gilli Smyth) – space whisper
High T. Moonweed (Tim Blake) – synthesizer, keyboards
Bloomdido Bad de Grass (Didier Malherbe) – Selmer sax, flute
Le Pere Cushion de Strasbourger (Pierre Moerlen) – drums, percussion
Mister T. Being (Mike Howlett) – souper bass
Steve Hillage - lead guitar, vocals
Miquette Giraudy - synthesizer, vocals

Credits
Andy Scott – engineer
Daevid Allen, Christian Gence – mix at Studio Izason, Paris
Venux De Luxe (Francis Linon) – live sound
Grant Cunlisse – stage management
Martin Sylvie – innersleeve photo
Daevid Allen – outer cover

References

Gong (band) live albums
1977 live albums